Lukáš Michael Vytlačil (born April 23, 1985) is a Czech flutist, historian, musicologist and conductor.

Curriculum vitae 
After studying at the Conservatory in Teplice, where he studied the transverse and recorder and later also conducting with Jan Valta, he continued at Charles University. Here he first graduated in the class of Jana Semerádová in the field of Historical Musical Practice, realized at the Faculty of Education in cooperation with the Týn School Collegium Marianum (2011), and then at the Faculty of Arts musicology (2017). Under the leading of Rebecca Stewart, he also studied the interpretation of vocal polyphony and attended a number of interpretation courses with prominent musicians and educators, such as Peter Holtslag, Ashley Solomon, Barthold Kuijken, Jostein Gundersen, Anneke Boeke, Petr Zejfart, Jorge Salgado Correia and others.

In the years 2013–2018, he was a research assistant in the Department of Music History of the Institute of Ethnology of the Academy of Sciences of the Czech Republic, and from 2018 to 2022 he worked as a research assistant in the Biographical Archive of the Institute for Czech Literature of the Academy of Sciences of the Czech Republic. Since 2022, he has been working at the National Heritage Institute. His research focuses mainly on the history of the late Middle Ages and the early modern period, the Reformation, music history and publishing activities. His publishing activity includes several monographs and editions, studies and articles, dictionary entries etc. He is also a member of the Association of Historians of the Czech Republic.

In his music he devotes himself to the so-called historically informed interpretation as a flauto traverso and recorder player, conductor and vocalist. He is engaged in concert and pedagogical activities. He is the artistic director of the Ensemble Sporck and also performs with other ensembles, such as Ensemble Inégal, with which he has participated in several recordings, Musica Florea, Capella Regia, etc. Between 2006 and 2008, he was the choirmaster of the children's choir Fontána in Teplice and as a conductor he also collaborated with the North Bohemian Philharmonic Orchestra and the Orchestra of the Youth Forum. From 2005 to 2009 he taught at the Conservatory in Teplice. Since 2014, he has been leading the recorder class at the Jan Deyl Conservatory in Prague.

He is a chaplain of the Order of Saint Lazarus of Jerusalem, where he is involved in charitable projects, for which in 2019 he received from the mayor Hl. of the City of Prague Zdeněk Hřib Křesadlo Award for 2018 awarded by the Hestia Foundation. He works for the Old Catholic Church in the Czech Republic as the editor-in-chief of the Communio magazine. He is also engaged in the creation of spiritual songs lyrics, and spiritual reflections.

Awards 

 2007 – Leoš Janáček Foundation Award
 2019 – "Křesadlo" for the year 2018

Bibliography (selection)

Monographies and editions 

 Kronika obce Kačice 1932–1939 [Chronicle of the village of Kačice]. Togga, Praha 2019. 
 Antonín Reichenauer: Concerto in G per oboe, due violini, viola e basso. [A critical edition]. Fontes Musicae Bohemiae 1. Togga, Praha 2016. 
 Jan Olejník: Etudy a písničky pro příčnou flétnu = Etudes and Folt Songs for Flute. Amos Editio, Praha 2015
 Jacques Martin Hotteterre: Zásady hry na příčnou flétnu, zobcovou flétnu a hoboj. [Translation, introduction and notes]. Vyšehrad, Praha 2013. 
 Čtyři tvrziště na Slánsku. Hradečno, Humniště, Ostrov a Řisuty [Four fortresses at the Slaný region. Hradečno, Humniště, Ostrov and Řisuty]. Zapomenuté hrady, tvrze a místa 34. Petr Mikota, Plzeň 2006.

References

External links 

Works in Bibliography of the Czech Lands History (Historical Institute, Czech Academy of Sciences)
 Digital repository on Academia.edu.

1985 births
Living people
Czech flautists
21st-century Czech historians
Czech academics
Recorder players
Czech musicologists
Music historians
Czech conductors (music)
Male conductors (music)
Charles University alumni
Old Catholics
Recipients of the Order of Saint Lazarus (statuted 1910)
People from Kladno